Hagith, Haggith or Hagit can refer to:

 Haggith - Biblical character
 Hagith (opera) - the opera by Karol Szymanowski
 Hagith (spirit) - the Olympian spirit in the Arbatel de magia veterum
 Hagit (name) - Hebrew female first name in contemporary Israel
Hagit Borer
Hagit Yaso
 Mitzpe Hagit, West Bank settlement, called for a woman of that name